State Route 360 (SR 360) is a  state highway located in the northwestern part of the U.S. state of Georgia. The highway connects Hiram with Marietta, and travels within portions of Paulding and Cobb counties.

Route description 
SR 360 begins at an intersection with US 278/SR 6/SR 120 (Jimmy Lee Smith Parkway) in Hiram, within Paulding County. At its western end, SR 120 and SR 360 travel concurrently to the north. They intersect SR 6 Bus. (Atlanta Highway). The routes then split, with SR 360 turning to the southeast on Macland Road. The route then intersects SR 92 (Hiram–Acworth Highway). It enters Cobb County. At the end of Macland Road, SR 360 follows Powder Springs Road to the northeast, passing between Kennesaw Mountain National Battlefield Park and Al Bishop Softball Complex. It continues to the northeast and meets its eastern terminus, an intersection with SR 5/SR 120 (South Marietta Parkway SE) in Marietta. The route is an important commuter route, connecting residential areas in Paulding County to commercial and industrial areas in Cobb County.

The only section of SR 360 that is included as part of the National Highway System, a system of roadways important to the nation's economy, defense, and mobility, is the concurrent section with SR 120 in the Hiram area.

History 
In early 1937, the roadway that would eventually be signed as part of SR 360 was established as part of SR 120 in the Hiram area. Near the end of 1940, this entire segment of SR 120 was paved. Between 1963 and 1966, SR 360 was established from Hiram to Marietta, but it is unclear whether the segment concurrent with SR 120 was established at this time.

Major intersections

See also

References

External links 

 Georgia Roads (Routes 341 - 360)

360
Transportation in Paulding County, Georgia
Transportation in Cobb County, Georgia
Marietta, Georgia